Queenstown-Lakes District Council is the territorial authority for the Queenstown-Lakes District of New Zealand.

The council has 11 members: mayor of Queenstown-Lakes  and 10 ward councillors.

Composition

Councillors

 Mayor 
 Queenstown-Wakatipu Ward: Valerie Miller, Craig Ferguson, Penny Clark, John MacDonald, Glyn Lewers, Niki Gladding
 Wānaka Ward: Deputy Mayor Calum MacLeod, Niamh Shaw, Quentin Smith, 
 Arrowtown Ward: Heath Copland

Community boards

 Wānaka Community Board: Barry Bruce (Chair), Ed Taylor (Deputy Chair), Chris Hadfield, Councillor Niamh Shaw, Councillor Quentin Smith, Jude Battson, Deputy Mayor Calum MacLeod

History

The council was formed in 1989, replacing a council of the same name established in 1986. This council was established through the merger of Queenstown Borough District (established in 1866), Lake County Council (established in 1876), and Arrowtown Borough Council (established on 10 May 1877)

In 2020, the council had 442 staff, including 103 earning more than $100,000. According to the Taxpayers' Union think tank, residential rates averaged $2,744.

References

External links
 Official website

Queenstown-Lakes District
Politics of Otago
Territorial authorities of New Zealand